Middle Third may refer to:
Middle Third (County Tipperary barony), Ireland 
Middle Third (County Waterford barony), Ireland 
Middle-third rule, in structural engineering